WJER (1450 AM "The Voice of the Valley") is a commercial radio station. Licensed to the area of Dover-New Philadelphia, Ohio, it serves the Tuscarawas County area. It first began broadcasting in 1950, and had an FM sister station (101.7 WJER-FM) that operated from 1969 to 2006, which is today WHOF. The station was temporarily owned by Clear Channel Communications in a reverse LMA by owner Gary Petricola, who repurchased the AM station in 2007. In February 2016, WJER returned to the FM dial with a translator operating on 100.9 FM.

FM Translator
WJER programming is relayed to an FM translator.

History

Origins of WJER
Jeremiah E. Reeves, for which WJER is named, was a member of one of the most influential families in Tuscarawas County, starting several major industries, banks and hotels in the Dover-New Philadelphia area. After his death in 1920, the Reeves family continued the leadership traditions begun by Jeremiah.

Following World War II, the United States government saw the need to increase radio reach to citizens in rural as well as urban population centers, and many new AM stations were created. Jeremiah's daughter, Agnes (Reeves) Greer, filed for ownership of a new radio station for Dover, Ohio and was granted the license in 1949. As a tribute to her father, she requested the call letters for the station that were her father's initials, Jeremiah E. Reeves, or "JER".

On Wednesday, February 22, 1950 at 6 a.m., WJER Radio began broadcasting operations in the present studio facility at 646 Boulevard, a parcel of land that was part of the Reeves family estate. The 175-foot "original" tower was erected on land with 5 miles of copper wire buried beneath its surface.

WJER-FM was granted a license and began broadcasting in 1969 at 101.7. Originally, the FM station programmed "beautiful music" and was popular in doctor's offices and in elevators. As time went by WJER put more emphasis on the FM station, going "live" full-time by 1992. Both stations were locally-owned by Gary Petricola until 2003, when he sold them to Clear Channel Communications. Petricola, however, continued to operate both 101.7 FM and 1450 AM in a reverse LMA with Clear Channel.

In 2006 Petricola's WJER Radio LLC later repurchased the AM from Clear Channel for $200,000.

Relocation of the FM signal
On April 14, 2006, the Federal Communications Commission approved Clear Channel's request to move WJER-FM's community of license to North Canton, Ohio. The new location allowed the station to increase its power from 3,000 watts ERP to 6,000 watts ERP after the move.

In a gradual process, the stations began simulcasting for most of the broadcast day, a process which completed in December 2006.

WJER-FM signed off on December 27, and the license was transferred to North Canton, Ohio under the new callsign WHOF the next day. WJER (AM) continued to broadcast the original Dover/New Philadelphia-based programming.

Clear Channel signed on WHOF as adult contemporary-formatted "My 101.7" serving the Akron/Canton area on January 16, 2007.

Sports
WJER is the local affiliate for the following teams:
The Cleveland Browns
The Cleveland Cavaliers
The Cleveland Guardians
The Ohio State Buckeyes

On-air Personalities
Eric St. John
Rosko Roscolini
Paul Tiratto
Kelly Kyle
Steve Kelley
Michele Spring

External links

FM translator

JER
Oldies radio stations in the United States
Soft adult contemporary radio stations in the United States